La nudité toute nue is a 2007 French television documentary film directed by Olivier Nicklaus. It was first broadcast on 18 July 2007 on French television channel Canal+ during a special "all nude" day of programming on the channel presented by Mademoiselle Agnès.

Synopsis
In La nudité toute nue (English translation "Nudity exposed"), director Olivier Nicklaus travels all over Europe (Paris, Berlin, London, Amsterdam to meet various personalities filmed in the nude. Characters include nude performers in striptease or in media, art, activism to nude hedonist (naturism, yoga) or therapeutic or spiritual nudity.

Guests interviewed included photographer of nude models Terry Richardson, Vincent Bethell who launched The Freedom to be Yourself movement, designer Tom Ford, philosopher Jean-Luc Nancy, the transsexual icon Amanda Lepore and popular gay pornographic actor François Sagat.

Cast 
 Amira Casar
 Arielle Dombasle
 Amanda Lepore
 François Sagat
 Philipp Tanzer
 Tom Ford
 Louise de Ville
 Terry Richardson
 Velvet d'Amour 
 Jean-Luc Nancy
 Emmanuel Pierrat
 Spencer Tunick
 Boris Charmatz
 Élisabeth Lebovici
 Philippe Colomb
 Pauline Delhomme
 Harry Boudchicha
 Noémie Ventura
 Ernesto Sarezale
 Anne-Marie Corre
 Augustin Legrand

References

External links
 

French documentary films
2007 television films
2007 films
2007 documentary films
French television films
2000s French-language films
2000s French films